The 1968–69 New Orleans Buccaneers season was the 2nd season of the Buccaneers in the ABA. The Bucs traded Larry Brown and Doug Moe to the Oakland Oaks in exchange for Steve Jones and Ron Franz.

In the Western Division semifinals, the Bucs beat the Dallas Chaparrals in seven games. In the Division Finals, they were swept by the Oakland Oaks. This was their final playoff appearance as they stumbled to .500 next season prior to the move to Memphis on August 31, 1970.

Roster
 10 Mike Butler - Shooting guard
 34 Lee Davis - Power forward
 11 Ronald Franz - Small forward
 25 Gerald Govan - Center
 15 Jimmy Jones - Point guard
 23 Steve Jones - Shooting guard
 -- Dave Lee - Small forward
 33 Elton McGriff - Center
 32 Jackie Moreland - Power forward 
 12 Marlbert Pradd - Shooting guard
 21 Red Robbins - Center
 14 Glynn Saulters - Guard
 31 Jasper Wilson - Small forward

Final standings

Western Division

Playoffs 
Western Division Semifinals

Western Division Finals

Awards, records, and honors
1968 ABA All-Star Game played on January 28, 1969
 Jimmy Jones 
 Red Robbins

References

 Buccaneers on Basketball Reference

New Orleans
New Orleans Buccaneers
New Orleans Buccaneers, 1968-69
New Orleans Buccaneers, 1968-69